Blommaert is a surname. Notable people with the surname include:
Abraham Blommaert, (ca 1629-after 1671) Dutch painter from Middelburg
Jan Blommaert, Flemish linguist
Philip Blommaert (1809–1871), Flemish writer
Samuel Blommaert (1583–1651), Dutch merchant
Susan Blommaert, American actress